AEK Women's Volleyball Club is the women's volleyball section of the major Greek multi-sport club of AEK. It was founded in 1995 and has won one Greek Championship (2011–12), one Greek Cup (2022–23), and one Greek Super Cup (2011–12).

History

The women's volleyball club was established in 1930 and dissolved after a few years. It was re-established in 1995, after a merger with the Alsoupolis group, and participated for the first time in the local championship of Athens. The club gradually gained promotion to A1 Ethniki. Nevertheless, it was not well-prepared for participation in the first professional division and was relegated.

In the 2003–04 season, the club competed in the second professional division. The club was promoted to A1 Ethniki after winning the 2005–06 second professional division.

In the 2011–12 season, AEK won the A1 Ethniki for the first time in its history against Panathinaikos. They have also won the 2011–12 Greek Super Cup against Olympiacos.

In the first years, the volleyball departments of AEK were housed in the indoor "Leontios Hall" in Patissia and since 1989 in the historic Georgios Moschos Indoor Hall.

On 11 March 2023, the club won the first Greek Cup against Panathinaikos in Arta. This was the third top-tier national title for the women's department.

Recent seasons

Honours

Domestic competitions
 A1 Ethniki
 Winners (1): 2011–12
 Runners-up (2): 2012–13, 2013–14
 Greek Cup
 Winners (1): 2022–23
 Greek Super Cup
 Winners (1): 2011–12

European competitions
CEV Women's Challenge Cup
Quarter–Finals (1): 2011–12

International record

Team
Season 2022–2023, as of August 2022.

Notable players

  Anna Kavatha
  Aliki Konstantinidou
  Sofia Kosma
  Vasiliki Nikouli
  Maria Lamprinidou
  Ourania Gkouzou
  Eleni Memetzi
  Katerina Vasilaki
  Dimitra Giakoumi
  Zenia Tsima
  Nikoleta Koutouxidou
  Georgia Tzanakaki
  Athina Dilaveri
  Pola Kitsou
  Athanasia Totsidou
  Panagiota Rogka
  Fenia Papageorgiou
  Athina Papafotiou
  Dimitra Siori
  Izabel Ivanova
  Marina Kalaitzieva
  Sonja Borovinšek
  Aleksandra Kruk
  Bojana Doganjić
  Jelena Jošović
  Marijana Bašić
  Valeria Hejjas
  Katalin Kiss
  Marisa Fernández
  Mari Mendes

Notable coaches
  Apostolos Oikonomou
  Manolis Roumeliotis

Sponsorships
Great Sponsor: Escape Car Rentals
Official Sport Clothing Manufacturer: Macron
Official Broadcaster: N/A

See also
 AEK Men's Volleyball Club

References

External links
A.E.K. Official Website – Women's Volleyball 

Volleyball
Greek volleyball clubs
Volleyball clubs established in 1995